The 2009–10 FK-League was the first season of the FK-League. The season began on 25 December 2009, and ended on 19 March 2010. All matches were played at Yongin Gymnasium, Yongin.

Teams
 Hanbang Jecheon FC 
 Jeonju MAG FC
 FS Seoul
 Seoul Gwangjin FC
 Yes Gumi FC
 Yongin FS

League table

Championship Match

Champions

Awards
 Most Valuable Player : Oh Hyun-Jong (Jeonju MAG FC)
 Best Goalscorer : Shin Jong-hoon (FS Seoul, 22 goals) 
 Fair Play Team : Yongin FS

References

FK-League
2009 in futsal
2010 in futsal